Fortuna is a settlement on the island of Saint Thomas in the United States Virgin Islands. It is located in the far west of the island.

There are visible estate ruins in Fortuna.

References

Populated places in Saint Thomas, U.S. Virgin Islands
West End, Saint Thomas, U.S. Virgin Islands